Elk Peak can refer to the following mountains in the United States:

Elk Peak (California) in Siskiyou County
Elk Peak (Idaho), in Boise County
Elk Peak (Fergus County, Montana), a mountain in Fergus County, Montana
Elk Peak (Hill County, Montana), a mountain in Hill County, Montana
Elk Peak (Meagher County, Montana), in the Castle Mountains, Meagher County, Montana
Elk Peak (Oregon), near the West Fork Millicoma River, in Coos County, Oregon
Elk Peak (Washington) in Lewis County
Elk Peak (Wyoming) in Johnson County

See also
 Black Elk Peak, South Dakota
 West Elk Peak, Colorado

References